Júlio César Oliveira da Silva (simply Julio Oliveira) is a Brazilian actor, model and DJ. He is known for the telenovela Os Dez Mandamentos.

Early life 
Júlio Oliveira was born in São Paulo, Brazil on February 1 1990. As a child he loved acting and he debuted on stage in 2003.

Career 
In 2010 he made his television debut in the telenovela Ti-ti-ti. In 2011 he was part of the Brilhante team, in 2012 he was part of the play Equus. In 2013 he formed part of the telenovela Sangue Bom. In 2014 the same year he was part of the telenovela The Miracles of Jesus. In 2015 he was internationally recognized in the telenovela Oz dez Mandamentos. In 2017 he participated in the series Carinha do angel. In 2018 he was part of the Netflix series Gamebros. In 2019 and 2020 he was part of the HBO series Hard. In 2020 he was part of the short film Offline. 

He worked as a DJ and male model for magazines such as Junior Magazine and Mais Junior. In 2015 he caused a sensation during the filming of the novel Oz Dez Mandamentos for his appearance in gay magazines whose photos date from 2013.

Filmography

References

Brazilian male television actors
Male actors from São Paulo
1990 births
Living people